The 9th Battle Squadron was a short-lived squadron of the British Royal Navy consisting of battleships serving in the Grand Fleet.

History
The 9th Battle Squadron was formed at Grimsby on 27 July 1914, and comprised a number of the older Majestic-class pre-dreadnought battleships. These included:

 
 
 
 

Due to the age and obsolescence of its constituent vessels, on 7 August 1914 the 9th Battle Squadron was dissolved and the ships were allocated to guard ship duty.

References

Battle squadrons of the Royal Navy
Ship squadrons of the Royal Navy in World War I
Military units and formations established in 1914
Military units and formations disestablished in 1914